Pre-Christian may refer to:
Before Christianization (the spread of Christianity):
Historical polytheism (the worship of or belief in multiple deities)
Historical paganism (denoting various non-Abrahamic religions)
Before Christ (BC), the era before the year 1 in the Julian and Gregorian calendars
Classical antiquity, a period of history centered on the Mediterranean Sea, lasting from around the 8th century BC to the 5th century AD
Iron Age, lasting from around the 12th century BC to the 8th century AD